The Milliken Building, located at 1039 College St. in Bowling Green, Kentucky, was completed in 1963.  It was listed on the National Register of Historic Places in 2010.

It is an International Style building designed by Edwin A. Keeble.  It is designated WA-B-127.

It is a four-story building.

It was listed for its design not its age.

Its style might better be termed Contemporary rather than International, in part due to its use of brick, according to one source focused upon the Modern Automotive District.

It was built by Clarence Shaub, a construction contractor.

References

Further reading
National Register of Historic Places registration form, authored by architect Brian Clements

International style architecture in Kentucky
Buildings and structures completed in 1963
National Register of Historic Places in Bowling Green, Kentucky
1963 establishments in Kentucky
Office buildings in Kentucky
Office buildings on the National Register of Historic Places